John Scott Inkster was a British anesthesiologist born in 1924, one of the first paediatric anaesthetists. He graduated from the University of Aberdeen in 1945. Inkster's interest in anesthesia started during his time as a house physician at New End Hospital. John Inkster discovered Positive end-expiratory pressure

John Inkster died on 10 September 2011.

References

Scottish anaesthetists